Clifford "Cliff" B. Jones  (born 1 June 1944) is a British computer scientist, specializing in research into formal methods. He undertook a late DPhil at the Oxford University Computing Laboratory (now the Oxford University Department of Computer Science) under Tony Hoare, awarded in 1981. Jones' thesis proposed an extension to Hoare logic for handling concurrent programs, rely/guarantee.

Prior to his DPhil, Jones worked for IBM, between the Hursley and Vienna Laboratories. In Vienna, Jones worked with Peter Lucas, Dines Bjørner and others on the Vienna Development Method (VDM), originally as a method for specifying the formal semantics of programming languages, and subsequently for specifying and verifying programs.

Cliff Jones was a professor at the Victoria University of Manchester in the 1980s and early 1990s, worked in industry at Harlequin for a period, and is now a Professor of Computing Science at Newcastle University. He has been editor-in-chief of the Formal Aspects of Computing journal.

As well as formal methods, Jones also has interests in interdisciplinary aspects of computer science and the history of computer science.

Books
Jones has authored and edited many books, including:

 Understanding Programming Languages, Jones, C.B. Springer, Cham. Print  / online  (2020). 
Reflections on the Work of C.A.R. Hoare, Roscoe, A.W., Jones, C.B. and Wood, K. (eds.). Springer.  (2010).
 VDM: Une methode rigoureuse pour le development du logiciel,  Jones, C.B. Masson, Paris.  (1993).
 MURAL: A Formal Development Support System, Jones, C.B., Jones, K.D., Lindsay, P.A. and Moore, R. (eds.). Springer-Verlag.  (1991).
 Systematic Software Development using VDM (2nd Edition), Jones, C.B. Prentice Hall International Series in Computer Science, Prentice Hall. , 1990
 Case Studies in Systematic Software Development, Jones, C.B. and Shaw, R.C.F. (eds.). Prentice Hall International Series in Computer Science, Prentice Hall.  (1989).
 Essays in Computing Science, Hoare, C.A.R. and Jones, C.B. Prentice Hall International Series in Computer Science, Prentice Hall.  (1989).
 Systematic Software Development using VDM, Jones, C.B. Prentice Hall International Series in Computer Science, Prentice Hall.  (1986).
 Programming Languages and their Definition: Selected Papers of Hans Bekic (1936–1982), Jones, C.B. (editor). Lecture Notes in Computer Science, Volume 177, Springer-Verlag.  (1984).
 Formal Specification and Software Development, Bjørner, D. and Jones, C.B. Prentice Hall International Series in Computer Science, Prentice Hall.  (1982).
 Software Development: A Rigorous Approach,  Jones, C.B. Prentice Hall International Series in Computer Science, Prentice Hall.  (1980).
 The Vienna Development Method: The Meta-Language, Bjørner, D. and Jones, C.B. (editors). Lecture Notes in Computer Science, Volume 61, Springer-Verlag.  (1978).

References

External links
 Home page
 

1944 births
Living people
Alumni of Wolfson College, Oxford
Members of the Department of Computer Science, University of Oxford
IBM employees
Academics of the Victoria University of Manchester
Academics of Newcastle University
Computer science writers
Academic journal editors
English computer scientists
Formal methods people
Fellows of the British Computer Society
Fellows of the Association for Computing Machinery
Fellows of the Institution of Engineering and Technology
Fellows of the Royal Academy of Engineering